G:link, also known as the Gold Coast Light Rail, is a light rail system serving the Gold Coast in Queensland, Australia, and is the sole light rail system in Queensland. The system forms part of TransLink's South East Queensland public transport network and consists of a single  line of nineteen stations. The Helensvale railway station is the northern terminus of the system, while Broadbeach South is the southern terminus. The line opened on 20 July 2014 and was extended northwest from Gold Coast University Hospital to Helensvale on 17 December 2017.

Background
The Gold Coast is one of the fastest-growing regions in Australia, with an annual population growth of 2 - 3%. The project was first proposed in the Gold Coast City Council Transport Plan 1996 after some years of consideration and review. In 2002 the Queensland and Federal Governments each contributed $650,000 to fund the Gold Coast Light Rail Feasibility Study. In 2004 the draft summary report was released.

History

Stage 1

In 2009, the Queensland Government committed $464 million to the Gold Coast Rapid Transit (GCRT) project, supplementing $365 million committed by the Federal Government and $120 million provided by Gold Coast City Council.

In June 2011, the GoldLinq consortium comprising Bombardier Transportation, Downer EDI, Keolis, McConnell Dowell and Plenary Group was awarded the contract to build and operate the Gold Coast light rail line for 18 years under a Public Private Partnership.

In August 2012, the cost of the initial  section was estimated at $1.6 billion. Construction began on the Gold Coast University Hospital station shell in July 2010. In late 2010, early roadworks began in Broadbeach and Southport.

By November 2013, much of the work was complete with the southern section at Broadbeach being the only section of trackwork to be completed. Testing commenced on the northern section of the line in October 2013. The line opened on 20 July 2014, with a free travel day, before normal operations began on 21 July.

The system had a significant impact on property both directly and indirectly in the corridor. A total of $170 million was allocated for property resumptions. The Queens Park Tennis Club and Southport Croquet Club were both relocated.

Stage 2

After the successful opening and operations of Stage 1, the Queensland Government announced in February 2016 plans to extend the light rail line from the University Hospital to the Helensvale railway station, providing a connection with the Gold Coast railway line that connects the city with Brisbane, the state capital of Queensland. Financial commitment from the state and federal governments needed to progress with the extension was finalised in late 2016. The new extension includes  tracks and 3 new light rail stations, with Helensvale being the new northern terminus for the line. Construction commenced in 2016 with plans to be completed in time for the 2018 Gold Coast Commonwealth Games in April 2018. Construction finished early, ahead of schedule with passenger services commencing in December 2017.

Stage 3 extension 

Due to funding disputes among the three levels of government funding this project as well as the COVID-19 pandemic along with rising construction costs in recent years, the project kept getting delayed and pushed back. In February 2020, three parties were short-listed to build the extension:
a CPB Contractors / Seymour Whyte joint venture
a Fulton Hogan / UGL Rail joint venture
John Holland
It was announced in October 2020 that John Holland had won the contract, with the state government releasing a statement in 2021 saying that the agreement will see the construction consortium undertake detailed construction planning and start establishing a site presence along the  corridor.

In July 2022 construction formally started with water, sewerage and gas infrastructure upgrades and relocation on the Gold Coast Highway between Broadbeach and Nobby Beach. Major construction including earthworks and construction of the tracks will commence in 2023 with the project expected to be operational by 2025.

Planned stations 
Eight new light rail stations will be constructed with the original cost estimate of the project at $670 million, which has now blown out to $1.2 billion due largely to rising inflation post-pandemic.

Route 
The new extension will begin from the current southern terminus, Broadbeach South travelling on the median strip of the Gold Coast Highway for the whole way south to Burleigh Heads. The  extension will pass through Mermaid Beach, Nobby's Beach, Miami and Burleigh Heads with the hopes of creating better connectivity, reducing congestion and improving travel times.

Stage 4 extension 
The Gold Coast City Transport Strategy 2031 supports a future expansion to Coolangatta via the Gold Coast Airport. The  extension of the light rail line from Burleigh Heads station would continue south along the Gold Coast Highway, passing through the southern suburbs of Palm Beach and Tugun and connecting the city's international airport with the light rail. A potential light rail corridor has also been identified from the Airport to Coolangatta and will be preserved for possible future expansion. In August 2020, funding was provided to formulate a business case for the extension. Since 2021 community consultation and preliminary works have begun on stage 4.

Route

The single  line runs from Helensvale railway station to Broadbeach South. Beginning at Helensvale railway station, the line runs parallel to the Gold Coast railway line until it meets the Smith Street Motorway, which it then follows, stopping at Parkwood and Parkwood East. The next two stops serve the Gold Coast University Hospital and the Gold Coast campus of Griffith University. The line runs south, passing over the Smith Street Motorway and the depot before reaching Queen Street station and Nerang Street station that services the Southport medical precinct. The next two stops serve the Australia Fair Shopping Centre, and the following stop serves the Broadwater Parklands. The line passes over the Nerang River before reaching the only stop in Main Beach, which serves the Sea World theme park. The next stops are Surfers Paradise North and Cypress Avenue, the latter serving the Chevron Renaissance Shopping Centre and the Funtime amusement park. The next stop, Cavill Avenue serves the heart of Surfers Paradise including the Cavill Avenue pedestrian mall and Paradise Centre shopping centre. The following station services the Q1 residential tower as well as the SkyPoint observation deck. The next stops are Northcliffe, Florida Gardens and Broadbeach North, the latter serving the Gold Coast Convention & Exhibition Centre, The Star Gold Coast, the Oasis Shopping Centre and the Oracle Shopping Centre. The line terminates at Broadbeach South which serves Pacific Fair Shopping Centre and provides bus connections to southern suburbs as well as the Gold Coast Airport. It takes around 44 minutes to travel from one end of the line to the other.

There are nineteen stations on the line. One station is located in Helensvale, two are in Parkwood, seven are in Southport, one is in Main Beach, six are in Surfers Paradise, and two are in Broadbeach. All but one of the stations are street-level open-air structures with passenger canopies on the platforms. The Gold Coast University Hospital station is underground. Eleven stations have side platforms and eight have an island platforms. Eight of the stations have kiosks on the platforms. Seven stations offer transfers to bus services and Helensvale also offers transfers to train services. Two of the stations have free park-and-ride lots with a total of 1,400 new parking spaces. The most heavily trafficked station is Cavill Avenue, with an average of 4,729 daily passengers in February 2016.

Infrastructure

The system uses standard gauge tracks with  overhead catenary. It primarily operates in a centre-running configuration.

Rolling stock

The Gold Coast Rapid Transit fleet consists of 18 Bombardier Flexity 2 trams built in Germany. The trams feature low floors and have dedicated spaces for wheelchairs, prams and surfboards. Fourteen trams were ordered to serve the original section of the line. Four additional trams were ordered in November 2015 to service the Helensvale extension. These were delivered in September and October 2017.

Operation
Services are operated by Keolis Downer, a joint venture between Keolis and Downer Rail managed by General Manager Charlie Davis. Keolis Downer operates Yarra Trams in Melbourne since November 2009, an integrated transport provider in Newcastle NSW which includes the light rail system. Fares are set by TransLink with all stations fitted with go card readers. TransLink charges fares that increase as passengers travel through eight concentric zones radiating outward from the Brisbane central business district; All G:link stations are located within zone 5.

Service frequencies (in minutes) from 17 December 2017:

† No service between Helensvale station and Gold Coast University Hospital

On Monday to Friday mornings (midnight to 5 am), light rail services are replaced on most of the routes by Surfside Buslines route 700. These buses do not service the section between Helensvale station and Gold Coast University Hospital.

Patronage
Over 1.74 million passengers used the Gold Coast Light Rail in its first 100 days after opening. More than five million paid trips were made in the first nine months of operation. 6.6 million passengers were carried on the line in its first year, and total public transport users on the Gold Coast - across buses and trams - increased by 25 per cent. In February 2016 the Queensland Government announced the ten million passenger milestone had been reached and noted that Cavill Avenue was the busiest station with 4,729 boardings a day.

The following table lists patronage figures for the network during the corresponding financial year. Australia's financial years start on 1 July and end on 30 June. Major events that affected the number of journeys made or how patronage is measured are included as notes.

Potential extensions

References

External links
Official site

Keolis
Light rail in Australia
Public transport on the Gold Coast, Queensland
Railway lines opened in 2014
Gold Coast Light Rail
2014 establishments in Australia
750 V DC railway electrification